Cabbage soup is a soup featuring cabbage.  It may also refer to:

 Shchi, a cabbage soup of Eastern European origins
 The Cabbage Soup, a French film